Yasir Suleiman CBE is the Sultan Qaboos Bin Said Professor of Modern Arabic Studies at the University of Cambridge. He is a Palestinian Arab living in the diaspora.

Suleiman holds degrees from Amman University, the University of St Andrews, and Durham University.

He lectures nationally and internationally on various topics related to the Middle East.

He was selected to be a trustee of the International Prize for Arabic Fiction (2007—2009).

He was appointed Commander of the Order of the British Empire (CBE) in the 2011 Birthday Honours for his services to scholarship.

Bibliography
In addition to authoring books, Yasir Suleiman was an editor of a number of monographs is Arabic studies.
 Arabic in the Fray: Language Ideology and Cultural Politics (2013) Edinburgh University Press, 
 A War of Words: Language and Conflict in the Middle East (2004) Cambridge University Press, 
 The Arabic Language and National Identity: A Study in Ideology (2003) Georgetown University Press, 
 The Arabic Grammatical Tradition: A Study in Ta'lil (2000) Edinburgh University Press,

References

Humanities academics
Academics of the University of Edinburgh
Fellows of King's College, Cambridge
Living people
Palestinian academics
Commanders of the Order of the British Empire
Year of birth missing (living people)
University of Jordan alumni
Alumni of the University of St Andrews
Alumni of Durham University